The 1941 Buffalo Bulls football team was an American football team that represented the University of Buffalo as an independent during the 1941 college football season. In their sixth season under head coach Jim Peele, the Bulls compiled a 3–4–1 record. The team played its home games at Rotary Field in Buffalo, New York.

Schedule

References

Buffalo
Buffalo Bulls football seasons
Buffalo Bulls football